Nina Grosse (born 11 August 1958) is a German film director and screenwriter. She has directed 14 films since 1983. Her 2004 film Olga's Summer was entered into the 26th Moscow International Film Festival.

Selected filmography
 The Glass Sky (1987)
 Tote leben nicht allein (1990, TV film)
 Rider of the Flames (1998)
 Olga's Summer (2004)
  (2009, TV film)
 The Weekend (2012)

References

External links

1958 births
Living people
Mass media people from Munich